The glycine receptor, alpha 4, also known as GLRA4, is a human pseudogene.  The protein encoded by this gene is a subunit of the glycine receptor.

References

External links 
 

Ion channels